Bass River may refer to:

Australia
 Bass River (Victoria), a relatively short coastal river

Canada
 Bass River, Nova Scotia, an unincorporated rural community in Colchester County and small river therein located
 Bass River, Kent County, an unincorporated rural community in Weldford Parish, Kent County, New Brunswick
 Little Bass River, Nova Scotia

United States
 Bass River (Michigan), a tributary of the Grand River in Ottawa County
 Bass River (Massachusetts), an estuary and village in South Yarmouth, Massachusetts, United States
 Bass River (New Jersey), a tributary of the Mullica River
 Bass River Township, New Jersey

See also
Bass (disambiguation)